Ivor Gardiner (3 December 1903 – 17 July 1951) was a South African cricketer. He played in 25 first-class matches from 1926/27 to 1937/38.

References

External links
 

1903 births
1951 deaths
South African cricketers
Border cricketers
Western Province cricketers
People from Queenstown, South Africa
Cricketers from the Eastern Cape